Claire King (born Claire Nortcliff on 5 January 1972 in Mexborough, West Riding of Yorkshire) is an English author, best known for her novel The Night Rainbow.

Biography 
King went to school at Mexborough School, Mexborough, and studied at Newnham College, University of Cambridge, graduating in Economics. In 1990 she appeared on The Crystal Maze.

The Night Rainbow 
King's debut novel was released on 14 February 2013 by Bloomsbury UK.
 The book was first published in the United Kingdom through Bloomsbury Publishing and narrates the story of two sisters living in a small village in Southern France.

Kirkus Reviews and Library Journal both reviewed the work, with Kirkus giving it a mixed review stating it was "hampered by a limited perspective, though well-written and sometimes quite moving".

Everything Love Is 
King's second novel was released on 28 July 2016 by Bloomsbury UK. The book was first published in the United Kingdom through Bloomsbury Publishing and narrates the story of Baptiste Molino, a therapist attempting to resolve the mystery of the identity of his birth mother. Shelf Awareness called it a "haunting, rewarding memory novel".

Personal life 
King lived for 15 years in Languedoc-Roussillon, France, the setting for The Night Rainbow. She now lives in Gloucestershire with her husband and children. King's third novel is underway; set in Yorkshire, it will examine issues of love and social class.

References

British writers
Alumni of Newnham College, Cambridge
1972 births
Living people
People from Mexborough